Robert John "Bob" Andrzejczak (born May 1, 1986) is an American Democratic Party politician who represented the 1st Legislative District in the New Jersey State Senate from January 15, 2019, when he was appointed to fill the vacancy created by the resignation of Jeff Van Drew, until December 5, 2019. Andrzejczak previously served in the New Jersey General Assembly from March 21, 2013, to January 14, 2019, when he was appointed to fill the vacancy created by the resignation of Matthew W. Milam.

Early life 
Andrzejczak was raised in the North Cape May section of Lower Township, New Jersey, and graduated from Lower Cape May Regional High School in 2004. He attended the Williamson College in Media, Pennsylvania, before joining the United States Army in 2005. Andrzejczak had served in the Iraq War as a sergeant in the Army's 25th Infantry Division until his discharge following an injury from a grenade explosion which led to the amputation of his left leg in 2009. As a result, he was awarded the Purple Heart and Bronze Star; his recovery was featured on a 2009 episode of The Oprah Winfrey Show. Following his return from military service, Andrzejczak joined the Cape May Veterans of Foreign Wars where he became active in veterans' issues.

New Jersey Assembly 
After Matthew W. Milam resigned from his seat in the Assembly on February 28, 2013, Andrzejczak was appointed to the Assembly after being selected by Democratic committee members from Atlantic, Cape May and Cumberland counties. He was sworn in on March 21, 2013, and subsequently won election to a full term in 2013. Andrzejczak is a resident of Middle Township. He is married to his wife Trisha, with whom he has two children. He resigned from the Assembly on January 14, 2019.

Committee assignments 
Agriculture and Natural Resources 
Military and Veteran Affairs
Intergovernmental Relations Commission

New Jersey Senate 

On November 5, 2018, 1st District State Senator Jeff Van Drew won a seat to the United States House of Representatives, creating a vacancy for his state senate seat. On January 6, 2019, Van Drew formally nominated Bob Andrzejczak for his replacement, which the Democratic Committees of the 1st Legislative District approved  unanimously. On January 15, the state senate formally swore in Andrzejczak as state senator.

Tenure 
Andrzejczak has said he is opposed to the legalization of Marijuana in 2019. The Chairman of the Cumberland County GOP Mike Testa has announced he would challenge Andrzejczak in the 2019 special election. In the first quarter of 2019 Testa out-raised Andrzejczak 6 to 1. Testa went on to beat Andrzejczak in the November special election.

Committee assignments 
Military and Veterans Affairs 
Joint Committee on Public Schools
Budget and Appropriations

District 1
New Jersey's 1st Legislative District encompasses parts of Atlantic County, New Jersey, Cumberland County, New Jersey, and all of Cape May County, New Jersey. The current representatives from the 1st district to the 218th New Jersey Legislature are:

Senator Bob Andrzejczak (D) 
Assemblyman Bruce Land (D) 
Assemblyman Matthew Milam (D)

Electoral history

New Jersey Senate

New Jersey Assembly

References

External links
Assemblyman Andrzejczak's legislative web page, New Jersey Legislature
New Jersey Legislature financial disclosure forms
2016 2015 2014 2013 2012

1986 births
Living people
United States Army personnel of the Iraq War
Democratic Party New Jersey state senators
People from Lower Township, New Jersey
People from Middle Township, New Jersey
United States Army non-commissioned officers
American amputees
21st-century American politicians